The Qutb Shahi dynasty (Persian:  Qotb-Šâhiyân) was a Persianate Shia Islamic dynasty of Turkoman origin that ruled the Sultanate of Golkonda in southern India. After the collapse of Bahmani Sultanate, the Qutb Shahi dynasty was established in 1512 AD by Sultan-Quli Qutb-ul-Mulk, better known though less correctly referred to in English as "Quli Qutb Shah". 

In 1636, Mughal emperor Shah Jahan forced the Qutb Shahis to recognize Mughal suzerainty and pay periodic tributes. The dynasty came to an end in 1687 during the reign of its seventh sultan Abul Hasan Qutb Shah, when the Mughal ruler Aurangzeb arrested and jailed Abul Hasan for the rest of his life in Daulatabad, incorporating Golconda into the Mughal empire. The kingdom extended from the parts of modern-day states of Karnataka, Andhra Pradesh, Odisha and Telangana. The Golconda sultanate was constantly in conflict with the Adil Shahis and Nizam Shahis.

The Qutb Shahis were patrons of Persianate Shia culture. The official and court language of the Golconda sultanate during the first 90 years of its existence (c. 1512 – 1600) was also Persian. In the early 17th century, however, the Telugu language was elevated to the status of the Persian language, while towards the end of the Qut Shahis' rule, it was the primary court language with Persian used occasionally in official documents. According to Indologist Richard Eaton, as Qutb Shahis adopted Telugu, they started seeing their polity as the Telugu speaking state, with the elites of the sultanate viewing their rulers as "Telugu Sultans".

History
The dynasty's founder, Sultan Quli Khawas Khan Hamdani was born in Hamadan Province, Iran. He belonged to the Qara Qoyunlu, an Iranian Turkmen Muslim tribe and therefore a descendant of Qara Yusuf. In the 16th century, he migrated to Delhi with his uncle, Allah-Quli, some of his relatives and friends. Later he migrated south, to the Deccan and served the Bahmani sultan, Mahmood Shah Bahmani II, who was of Deccani Muslim ethnicity. He declared the independence of Golconda, after the disintegration of the Bahmani Kingdom into the five Deccan sultanates. Soon after, he declared independence from the Bahmani Sultanate, took the title Qutub Shah, and established the Qutb Shahi dynasty of Golconda. He was later assassinated in 1543 by his son, Jamsheed, who assumed the sultanate. Jamsheed died in 1550 from cancer. Jamsheed's young son reigned for a year, at which time the nobility brought back and installed Ibrahim Quli as sultan.

The early Qutb Shahi sultans prohibited Hindus from observing their religious festivals, states Annemarie Schimmel – a scholar of Islamic studies. During the reign of Muhammad Quli Qutb Shah (1580–1611), who was a more tolerant ruler, the Hindus were allowed to observe their religious festivals like Diwali and Holi in open. Later Sultans such as Tana Shah, appointed Brahmin Hindus such as Madanna and Akkanna as ministers in charge of tax collection and exchequer. However, this led to significant factionalism between the Muslim elites and the rising power of the Brahmin Hindus. The Muslim faction reached out to Aurangzeb, who sent a regiment led by his son to attack Golconda. They beheaded Madanna and Akkanna, along with plundering the property and killing many more Hindus in administrative positions of the Qutb Shahi dynasty. Shortly thereafter, the last Sultan of dynasty was jailed in Daulatabad by Aurangzeb, and the Qutb Shahi dynasty came to an end.

Golconda, and with the construction of the Char Minar, later Hyderabad, served as capitals of the sultanate, and both cities were embellished by the Qutb Shahi sultans. The dynasty ruled Golconda for 171 years, until the Mughal emperor Aurangzeb conquered the Deccan in 1687. The territory of the Golconda Sultanate was made into a Mughal imperial province, Hyderabad Subah.

Economy 

The Golconda Sultanate was notoriously wealthy. While its primary source of revenue was land tax, the sultanate greatly profited from its monopoly on diamond production from mines in the southern districts of the kingdom. The sultanate also had control over the Krishna and Godavari deltas, giving it access to craft production in the villages of the area, where goods like textiles were produced. The town of Masulipatnam served as the Golconda Sultanate's primary seaport for the export of diamonds and textiles. The kingdom reached the peak of its financial prosperity in the 1620s and 1630s.

Cotton-Weaving 
During the early seventeenth century, a strong cotton-weaving industry existed in the Deccan region. Large quantities of cotton cloth were produced for domestic and exports consumption. High quality plain and patterned cloth made of muslin and calico was produced. Plain cloth was available as white or brown colour, in bleached or dyed variety. This cloth was exported to Persia and European countries. Patterned cloth was made of prints which were made indigenously with indigo for blue, chay-root for red coloured prints and vegetable yellow. Patterned cloth exports were mainly to Java, Sumatra and other eastern countries. Golconda had a strong trading relationship with Ayutthaya Siam.

Diamonds 

The Golconda Sultanate was known for its diamonds which were dubbed the Golconda diamonds. These diamonds were sought after diamonds long before the Qutb Shahi dynasty came to power, and they continued to supply this demand through the European traders.

Diamonds from mines (especially the Kollur Mine presently in Guntur district, Andhra Pradesh) were transported to the city of Hyderabad to be cut, polished, evaluated and sold. Golconda established itself as a diamond trading centre and until the end of the 19th century, the Golconda market was the primary source of the finest and largest diamonds in the world.

Culture

The Qutb Shahis were patrons of Persianate Shia culture. Over the first 90 years of their rule (c. 1512 – 1600), they championed Persian culture. Their official edicts and court language was in Persian only. Quli Qutb Mulk's court became a haven for Persian culture and literature.  In early 17th-century, with Sultan Muhammad Quli Qutb Shah (1580–1612) a change began. He began to patronize the Telugu language and culture as well. Edicts began to be issued both in Persian and Telugu. Towards the end of the dynasty, these were primarily in Telugu with a summary in Persian. As they adopted Telugu, they saw their territory as the Telugu speaking region, states Indologist Richard Eaton, with their elites considering the rulers as "Telugu Sultans".

Sultan Muhammad Quli Qutb Shah (1580–1612) wrote poems in Dakhini Urdu, Persian and Telugu. Subsequent poets and writers, however wrote in Urdu, while using vocabulary from Persian, Hindi and Telugu languages. During the reign of Abdullah Qutb Shah in 1634 AD, an ancient Sanskrit text on love and sex Ratirahasya by Kokkoka was translated into Persian and named Lazzat-un-Nisa (Flavors of the Woman).

Architecture 
The Qutb Shahi architecture was Indo-Islamic, a culmination of Indian and Persian architectural styles. Their style was very similar to that of the other Deccan Sultanates. The Qutb Shahi rulers built the Char Minar.

Some examples of Qutb Shahi Indo-Islamic architecture are the Golconda Fort, tombs of the Qutb Shahis, Char Minar and the Char Kaman, Mecca Masjid, Khairtabad Mosque, Hayat Bakshi Mosque, Taramati Baradari and the Toli Mosque.

Administration 

The Qutb Shahi Kingdom was a highly centralized state. The sultan enjoyed absolute executive judicial and military powers. When he was away, a regent carried to carry on the administration on behalf of the king. The Peshwa (Prime Minister) was the highest official of the sultanate. He was assisted by a number of ministers, including Mir Jumla (finance minister), Kotwal (police commissioner), and Khazanadar (treasurer).

For most of their reign, the Qutb Shahi sultanate had a system of jagirs, who would provide troops as well as collect taxes. They were allowed to keep a portion of the taxes and give the sultan the rest. Tax collection was through auction farms, the highest bidder used to get the Governorship. While the Governors enjoyed luxurious life style, they had to bear the brunt of severe punishments for default, consequently they were harsh on the people. Tana Shah – the last Sultan, with advice from his Brahmin ministers responsible for tax collection, introduced a reform whereby all taxes were collected by civil professionals for a region. The soldiers, government workers, court officials and all the Muslim elites were paid allowances from the Sultan's treasury. These reforms brought a large increase in revenues.

According to Moreland, in the earlier system, the Persian origin Muslims were paid the highest, then the other Indian Muslims. In early 17th century, the Persian origin Muslims became rich by lending money on high interest (usury) of 4-5% per mensem much to the despair of Hindus.

The Sultanate had 66 forts, and each fort was administered by a Nayak. In the second half of the 17th century, the Qutb Shahi Sultan hired many Hindu Nayaks. According to Kruijtzer, these were mainly Brahmins. According to another account, these were mainly from the Kamma, Velama, Kapu, and Raju warrior castes. They served as civil revenue officers. After the Mughals dismissed the Qutb Shahi dynasty in 1687, these Hindu Nayaks were also dismissed and replaced with Muslim military commanders.

Administrative divisions 

The sultanate in 1670 comprised 21 sarkars (provinces) which in turn were divided into 355 parganas (districts).

Religion
The Qutb Shahi dynasty, like many Deccan Islamic dynasties, was a Shia Islam dynasty with roots in Persia (modern Iran). Initially they were very strict and they persecuted the Hindus who constituted the vast majority of the population. Open practice of Hindu festivals was forbidden in Golconda Sultanate. It was Muhammad Quli Qutb Shah who first reversed this policy, and allowed Hindus to practice their festivals and religion in open.

In the final decades of their rule, the Qutb Shahi dynasty rulers patronized Shia, Sufi, Sunni Islamic traditions, as well as the Hindu traditions. Prior to their end, Tana Shah advised by Madanna and Akkanna –his Brahmin ministers, began the tradition of sending pearls to the Bhadrachalam Temple of Rama on Rama Navami.

Rulers
The eight sultans in the dynasty were:

Tombs

The tombs of the Qutb Shahi sultans lie about one kilometer north of Golkonda's outer wall. These structures are made of beautifully carved stonework, and surrounded by landscaped gardens. They are open to the public and receive many visitors.

Family tree

See also

Hyderabad Deccan
Battle of Talikota

References

Further reading
Chopra, R. M., The Rise, Growth And Decline of Indo-Persian Literature, 2012, Iran Culture House, New Delhi.
Jawed Vashisht, Ghizal-e Raana (A selection of Quli Qutab Shah's ghazals)
Jawed Vashisht, Roop Ras (Romantic poems of Quli Qutab Shah)
Jawed Vashisht, Mohammed Quli aur Nabi ka Sadka
Jawed Vashisht, Dakhni Darpan

External links

 
States and territories established in 1518
States and territories disestablished in 1687
Empires and kingdoms of India
Dynasties of India
History of Telangana
Telugu people
Former countries in South Asia

de:Golkonda